Chiksaura is a small market village in Hilsa, Nalanda District, in Bihar State in India.

The village is located in the Hilsa Community Development Block. The village has a police station. It is surrounded by green land. It is a centre place of about 4 km radius . People from about 25 villages come here for marketing purposes. There are many shops in Chiksaura Bazar. Almost all household things are available in the bazar including vegetables.

References

Villages in Nalanda district